Pipestem Resort State Park is a  state park located in southern West Virginia, on the border between Mercer and Summers counties.  The park was built with grants provided by the Area Redevelopment Administration of the U.S. Department of Commerce under the administration of President John F. Kennedy.  It is located in the gorge of the Bluestone River.

The Park name derives from pipestem, or narrowleaf meadowsweet (Spiraea alba), a locally common shrub historically used for making pipe stems.

The park features two hotels, one of which may be reached only by an aerial tramway to the bottom of the gorge, 26 fully equipped wood cabins, a regular and a par-3 golf course, several restaurants, and other recreational activities, including its own stable of horses.  

The park's nature center features displays of native plants and animals, and offers nature programs.  The Nature Center is open year-round, and includes the Harris Homestead, a reconstructed 1900s (decade) period historic house museum, barn and meat house.

Nearby cities and attractions 
 Athens, West Virginia
 Concord University
 Princeton, West Virginia
 Hinton, West Virginia
 Bluestone State Park
 Bluestone Lake
 New River
 Sandstone Falls

See also

List of West Virginia state parks

References

External links 

 

Campgrounds in West Virginia
Golf clubs and courses in West Virginia
Nature centers in West Virginia
Protected areas established in 1963
Protected areas of Mercer County, West Virginia
Protected areas of Summers County, West Virginia
Resorts in West Virginia
State parks of West Virginia
State parks of the Appalachians